Panormou is an Athens Metro Line 3 station, located at Panormou Ave., near Ambelokipi, Greece. It is also quite close to Kifissias Ave.

Station layout

Cultural works
Mihalis Katzourakis's Mazareko is at the station's concourse and platforms, consisting of coloured neon lights.

References

Athens Metro stations
Railway stations opened in 2000
2000 establishments in Greece